The Vain Stakes is a Group 3 Thoroughbred horse race for three year old colts and geldings held under set weights with penalties conditions, over a distance of 1100 metres, held at Caulfield Racecourse, Melbourne, Australia annually in August.  Total prizemoney for the race is A$200,000.

History

Name
The race was first held in 1992 and is named in honour of the former champion racehorse and sire Vain.

Distance
 1992–2005 – 1200 metres
 2006–2008 – 1100 metres
 2009 – 1200 metres
 2010 onwards - 1100 metres

Grade
 1992–2012 - Listed race
 2013 -  Group 3 status

Name
 1992–1994 - Vain Quality Stakes
 1995–2009 - Vain Stakes
 2010 - Lister Diesel Stakes
 2011 onwards - Vain Stakes

Venue
1992–1993 - held at Sandown Park Racecourse
1994 - Caulfield Racecourse 
1995–1996 - held at Sandown Park Racecourse
1997 - Caulfield Racecourse 
1998–2001 - held at Sandown Park Racecourse
2002 onwards - Caulfield Racecourse

Winners

2022 - Giga Kick
2021 - Ingratiating
2020 - Our Playboy
2019 - Bivouac
2018 - Tony Nicconi
2017 - Jukebox
2016 - Russian Revolution
2015 - Gold Symphony
2014 - Get The Nod
2013 - Safeguard
2012 - Psychic Mick
2011 - Sepoy
2010 - Toorak Toff
2009 - Starspangledbanner
2008 - Fernandina
2007 - Shrewd Rhythm
2006 - Haradasun 
2005 - Red Dazzler 
2004 - Zankel 
2003 - Happy Strike 
2002 - Delago Brom 
2001 - North Boy 
2000 - Surtees
1999 - Dandy Kid
1998 - Splendid Horse 
1997 - Schubert
1996 - Syncopated
1995 - Principality
1994 - Cannibal King
1993 - Star Of Maple
1992 - Never Undercharge

See also
 List of Australian Group races
 Group races

References

Horse races in Australia
Caulfield Racecourse